Shamma Hamdan is an Emirati singer of Khaliji music. In 2012, she became the first Emirati woman ever to become a finalist in a season of Arabs Got Talent.

References

Living people
Emirati women singers
Folk guitarists
Year of birth missing (living people)